Swindle is a 2013 television film starring Noah Crawford, Chris O'Neal, Jennette McCurdy, Noah Munck, Ariana Grande, Ciara Bravo, and Fred Ewanuick. Based on Gordon Korman's novel of the same name, the film tells the story of Griffin (Noah Crawford), a boy who retrieves his friend's valuable baseball card from an unscrupulous collectibles dealer with the help of his friends. Sneak peeks promoting the film aired on Nickelodeon during three Sam & Cat episodes &  of last episode  Big Time Rush. The film premiered August 24, 2013 to an audience of over 4.2 million viewers. The film was released on DVD on March 19, 2014, and on Blu-ray on December 4, 2015.

Plot 
Griffin Bing (Noah Crawford) is a teenager known for helping out both friends and classmates in times of need. His friend Ben Dupree (Chris O'Neal) and his family are preparing to sell their home as a result of Ben's inventor father continuously failing at products. After one of his inventions accidentally punches a hole in the wall, the boys find a Honus Wagner baseball card inside. Rushing to the pawn store, they choose not to look up its actual worth and decide to sell it to Paul Swindell (Fred Ewanuick), a collectibles reseller who agrees to buy the card for $350.

The next morning, Griffin and Ben discover on the news that Swindell has claimed to have found the card himself and plans to sell it for  $1.2 million. The two angrily head back to Swindell, who refuses to return the card. As a result, Griffin bands together a team to take the card back in an elaborate heist. In addition to Griffin and Ben, the team consists of cheerleader Amanda Benson (Ariana Grande), actress Savannah Westcott (Jennette McCurdy), and “the muscle” Darren Vader (Noah Munck). Griffin's younger sister, hacker Melissa (Ciara Bravo), also attempts to join the team, but Griffin rejects her.

Together, the team attempts to sneak into Swindell's shop and steal the card. Griffin finds the card but has second thoughts, worried that they would be the prime suspects in an investigation of the robbery. After Melissa saves the team from being caught by hacking into the shop's alarm system, Griffin lets her join the team. Griffin then plans to have Swindell hand over the card to them. Subsequently, Anton Lefevre, a wealthy businessman, invites Swindell to auction off the card to him. Using video camera glasses with an earpiece, Amanda goes to the house of Eddie, a nerd at their school and a rare item collector, to find and obtain a rare red-headed "Captain Cybertor" action figure, which is commonly meant to have blue hair, but a handful of red-headed versions were accidentally released. Her earpiece switches off and, believing she cannot be heard, unknowingly reveals her true nerdy nature to the group (who can still hear her). Ultimately, Eddie lends the toy (and its common counterpart) to Amanda in return for a date with him.

The team plans to get the card at the Lakeshore Hotel, where Swindell is planning to sell it. After arriving, Savannah pretends to be Swindell's bratty daughter and asks for his crown suite room key. Melissa hacks into the hotel's system and gives Swindell a cheap, horrible room. Savannah and Darren pretend to be two German kids who let Swindell lie to them about the red-headed Captain Cybertor's actual price, and sell it to Swindell for $10. Swindell then goes to a massage with Griffin, who is disguised as Lefevre. During the massage, Griffin informs Swindell of a collector named Ivan Volkov who has been searching for a red-headed Captain Cybertor.

Amanda swaps the Cybertor figures from their boxes, unbeknownst to Swindell. He sells it to Volkov for $80,000 and later sees through Ben's mustache disguise, finds Ben's room card, and enters the gang's room. Expecting this, the gang confronts him and tells him about the Cybertor switch. They offer him the red Cybertor in return for the Honus Wagner card and show him footage of Volkov furious at Swindell for giving him the blue one. Swindell lunges for the red toy, so they throw it around until Ben accidentally throws it off the balcony and onto a couple's wedding cake. They all chase after it. Meanwhile, Ben's dad is at the hotel and is showing off his new invention, called the "iGotit", hoping to win a cash prize on an invention game show.

After disrupting the wedding, the gang retrieves the Cybertor and again offer it to Swindell in exchange for the card. After Swindell gives the Cybertor to Volkov and flees under his orders, it is revealed that Volkov is actually Savannah's father, who, with two other men, were enlisted by Savannah to help Griffin. The gang reveals themselves as the actual owners of the card to Lefevre, who invites them to the auction. When Swindell attempts to leave the hotel, he bumps into an employee, who spills his case and reveals a load of fake Honus Wagner cards with Swindell's face on them. A hotel employee gives Swindle the $35,000 bill for the Crown Suite.

At the end, Griffin rewards the gang with $25,000 for their help. Ben explains his family did not need the money because his dad had earned money off of his invention, which briefly stopped Swindell at the hotel. Ben uses the money to send the deserving wedding couple on a real honeymoon. He also pays for the group's college and lets himself and his team spend the rest. Afterward, a little girl asks for Griffin's help retrieving her rare-breed bird from a fake groomer. As a result, Griffin decides that the group should keep the rest of the money, so they can continue to foil swindlers.

Cast

Main
 Noah Crawford as Griffin Bing ("The Brain")
 Chris O'Neal as Ben Dupree ("The Best Friend")
 Jennette McCurdy as Savannah Westcott ("The Actress")
 Noah Munck as Darren Vader ("The Muscle")
 Ariana Grande as Amanda "Mandy" Benson ("The Gymnast" / "Mandy the Mutant")
 Ciara Bravo as Melissa Bing, Griffin's younger sister ("The Hacker")
 Fred Ewanuick as Paul Swindell ("The Swindler")

Supporting
 Sandy Robson as Anton Leferve ("The Auctioner")
 Gardiner Millar as Ivan Volkov/Mr. Westcott, Savannah's father ("The Actor")
 Mitchell Duffield as Eddie Goldmeyer
 Ecstasia Sanders as Hotel Manager
 Chris Shields as Mr. Dupree
 Lucia Walters as Mrs. Dupree
 Farrah Aviva as the bride
 Aurelio DiNunzio as the bride's father
 Phillip Lee as Joy the Jock
 Marrett Green as News Reporter

Production
TBA

Reception
Common Sense Media gave the film a rating of 4 out of 5 stars. David Hinckley gave the film a glowing review in New York Daily News.

References

External links
 
 

2013 television films
2013 films
American comedy television films
Canadian comedy television films
Nickelodeon original films
English-language Canadian films
Films shot in British Columbia
2010s Canadian films
2010s American films
Baseball memorabilia